The Alfa Romeo Caimano is a concept car designed by Giorgetto Giugiaro of Italdesign and presented at the Turin Motor Show in 1971. The car is exhibited at the Museo Storico Alfa Romeo.

Design 
The Caimano features many unconventional design elements, one of the most striking being its large glass canopy-windshield, which incorporates the doors as well. The B and C pillars form a trapezoidal roll bar in the rear of the car, which also doubles as an adjustable spoiler which can be controlled from inside the cabin. Other features include two smaller windows on the doors for ventilation or paying toll, pop up headlights, a large Alfa Romeo logo printed on the hood in burnt orange and a cylindrical dashboard.

Specifications
The Caimano is based on the mechanicals of the Alfa Romeo Alfasud, using a 1.3 L (1,286 cc) Boxer H4 engine producing  and connected to a 5 speed manual transmission. The chassis is taken from the Alfasud as well, but has been shortened by almost 8 inches.

References 

Caimano
Italdesign concept vehicles